In military terms, 59th Division may refer to:

 Infantry divisions 

 59th Division (People's Republic of China)
 59th Mountain Infantry Division Cagliari - Italian Army of World War II
 59th (2nd North Midland) Division - British infantry division in World War I
 59th (Staffordshire) Infantry Division - British infantry division in World War II
59th Division (Imperial Japanese Army)
59th Infantry Division (Russian Empire)
59th Rifle Division (RSFSR)
59th Guards Rifle Division (Soviet Union)
 59th Rifle Division (Soviet Union)
59th Division (Spain)

Armored divisions 

 59th Tank Division (Soviet Union)